Mario Tokić (born 23 July 1975) is a former Croatian footballer who is the current assistant coach of Oman.

He retired following the end of the 2010–11 season.

Playing career

Club
Mario Tokić started his professional career in NK Rijeka in 1992. After six years, in 1998 he moved to Dinamo Zagreb. In 2001, he was transferred to the Austrian side Grazer AK, where he played until 2005, while at Grazer AK he scored what was called his best goal against Liverpool in a champions league qualifier, despite winning 1-0 Grazer AK still lost the tie 2-1.when he moved to Austria Wien.  At the end of the 2006-07 season Tokić announced he would be joining Austria's arch rivals Rapid for the new season. In August 2009, after two seasons with Rapid, the club announced that the contract with Tokić was cancelled.

International
Tokić made his debut for Croatia in a September 1998 European Championship qualification match away against the Republic of Ireland, coming on as a 77th-minute substitute for Zvonimir Soldo, and earned a total of 28 caps, scoring no goals. Tokić was part of the Croatian squad at Euro 2004 and the 2006 World Cup, but did not play any games at either tournament. His final international was a June 2006 friendly match against Spain.

Managerial career
On 6 July 2016, following the sacking of Valentin Barišić, Tokić was named manager of NK Lokomotiva.

In December 2016 Tokić returning the manager of NK Lokomotiva.

Career statistics

Club statistics

International appearances

Honours
Dinamo Zagreb
Prva HNL: 1998-99, 1999-00
Croatian Cup: 2001

Grazer AK
Austrian Bundesliga: 2003-04
ÖFB Cup: 2002, 2004
Austrian Super Cup: 2002

Austria Wien
Austrian Bundesliga: 2005-06
ÖFB Cup: 2006, 2007

Rapid Wien
Austrian Bundesliga: 2007-08
Austrian Super Cup: 2008
UEFA Intertoto Cup: 2007

References

External links
 
Mario Tokić profile, Player Details and Picture
Guardian football

1975 births
Living people
People from Derventa
Footballers from Rijeka
Croats of Bosnia and Herzegovina
Bosnia and Herzegovina emigrants to Croatia
Association football defenders
Croatian footballers
Croatia under-21 international footballers
Croatia international footballers
UEFA Euro 2004 players
2006 FIFA World Cup players
HNK Rijeka players
GNK Dinamo Zagreb players
NK Zagreb players
Grazer AK players
FK Austria Wien players
SK Rapid Wien players
Croatian Football League players
Austrian Football Bundesliga players
Croatian expatriate footballers
Expatriate footballers in Austria
Croatian expatriate sportspeople in Austria
Croatian football managers
NK Lokomotiva Zagreb managers